C3, C-3, C.3, C03, C.III or C-III may refer to:

Life and biology
 C3 carbon fixation in plants
 C3-convertase, an enzyme
 Complement component 3, a protein of the innate immune system
 Apolipoprotein C3, a human very low density lipoprotein 
 ATC code C03 Diuretics, a subgroup of the Anatomical Therapeutic Chemical Classification System
 Castavinol C3, a natural phenolic compound found in red wines
 Cytochrome-c3 hydrogenase, an enzyme
 Haplogroup C-M217, called C3 in older publications
 In human anatomy, C3 may refer to:
 Cervical vertebra 3, one of the cervical vertebrae of the vertebral column
 Cervical spinal nerve 3
 Clinical Cell Culture, a medical technology company
 C03, Malignant neoplasm of gum ICD-10 code
 C3 Collaborating for Health, a health-promotion NGO
 C3: an EEG electrode site according to the 10-20 system

Military
 C3, Command, control, and communications, a military concept
 C-3 (plastic explosive), a plastic explosive related to C4
 C-3, a United States military designation for the Ford Trimotor
 the designation for several German World War I and World War II armed reconnaissance aircraft
 AEG C.III
 AGO C.III, a reconnaissance biplane of World War I
 Albatros C.III
 DFW C.III, a DFW aircraft
 NAG C.III, an engine powering the Gotha G.IV aircraft
 C-3, a U.S. military transport version of the Martin 4-0-4
 Type C3 submarine (disambiguation), a World War II Imperial Japanese Navy cargo carrier submarine
 Spanish submarine C-3
 HMS C3, a 1906 British C class submarine
 Type C3-class ship, a type of merchant cargo ships of United States Maritime Commission "C" design
 USS C-3 (SS-14), a 1909 United States C class submarine
 USS Baltimore (C-3), an 1888 protected cruiser of the United States Navy
 Garda Crime and Security Branch (CSB), domestic security agency of Ireland's national police, also known as "C3"
 C3 Howitzer, a lengthened variant of the M101 used by the Canadian Armed Forces

Technology
 C3, characteristic energy, in astrodynamics, a measure of the rocket energy for an interplanetary mission that requires attaining an orbital velocity above escape velocity
 C3, the chemical symbol for 
 Tricarbon
 Cyclopropatriene
 C3.ai, an AI company founded by Thomas Siebel
 C3 linearization, a computer science algorithm for resolving the order of method resolution in multiple inheritance conditions
 Delfi-C3, a Dutch CubeSat satellite
 Saturn C-3, a 1960 rocket in the Saturn C series
 Chaos Communication Congress, the biggest annual hacker event in Europe
 Chrysler Comprehensive Compensation System, important in the development of Extreme Programming
 VIA C3, a computer processor
 Creatures 3, a 1999 video game
 Crysis 3, a 2013 video game
 Cluster 3, also known as Samba, an ESA satellite

Transportation
 Bavarian C III, a German steam locomotive model
 Bavarian C III (Ostbahn), an 1867 German steam locomotive model
 Chevrolet Corvette (C3), the third production design of the Chevrolet Corvette
 Circumferential Road 3 or C-3, an arterial road of Manila, Philippines
 Cierva C.3, a 1921 Spanish experimental autogyro 
 Citroën C3, a car
 Cowin C3, a car
 LB&SCR C3 class, a British LB&SCR locomotive
 London Buses route C3, a Transport for London contracted bus route 
 C3 (railcar), a bi-level railcar built by Kawasaki Railcar for the non-electrified branches of the Long Island Rail Road
 Nimrod NRA/C3, a 1983 Group C racing car never achieved
 Yamaha C3, a 2007 liquid cooled 49cc four-stroke motor scooter
 Two different ring expressways in Japan that are numbered C3:
 Tokyo Gaikan Expressway in Tokyo, Saitama and Chiba Prefectures
 Tōkai-Kanjō Expressway in Aichi, Gifu and Mie Prefectures

Music
 Hammond C3 organ
 High C in music (c3 in European notation)
 Low C in music (C3 in American notation)
 Tha Carter III, the title of an album by rapper Lil Wayne
 C3 Presents, independent American concert promoters

Other uses
 C3 (classification), a para-cycling classification
 C3 (light novel), a 2011 Japanese light novel series and anime by Hazuki Minase
 C3, a New Zealand logistics company owned by Linx Cargo Care Group
 C3, the code for permission to use specific land or premises for dwellings in town and country planning in the United Kingdom
 C3, the UEFA Europa League in football
 C3, a standard paper size defined in ISO 216
 Tippmann C-3, a pump-action paintball marker that uses propane gas
 C3 Church Global, a worldwide Pentecostal denomination
 C3, a class in FM radio broadcasting in North America
 Argus C3, a 35mm rangefinder camera
 Nokia C3 (disambiguation), various Nokia cellphones
 Caldwell 3 (NGC 4236), a barred spiral galaxy in Draco
 C3 policing, a methodology being employed by police to combat gangs in Springfield, Massachusetts
 Nielsen ratings that include recorded programs watched three days later
 Championing Community Children, a Philippine charitable organization abbreviated as C3
 Charles Keating III (born 1955), American former swimmer and real estate executive
 Charles III (born 1948), King of the United Kingdom and 14 other Commonwealth realms since 2022.
 C-III Capital Partners, an asset management and commercial real estate services company

See also 
 CCC (disambiguation)